Patrick Barclay is a Scottish sportswriter.

Journalism career
Barclay started his career with The Guardian in the 1970s. When the newspaper The Independent was launched in 1986, he was appointed its first football correspondent. He joined The Observer in 1991, and became football correspondent of The Sunday Telegraph in 1996. He held the post for 12 years.

Barclay joined The Times in February 2009 as its Chief Football Correspondent to replace Martin Samuel, who was joining the Daily Mail. Thus, Barclay became one of the few journalists to be the main writer for his discipline for all four quality newspaper groups in England: Times, Guardian-Observer, Telegraph, and Independent. Barclay left The Times in December 2011 due to cost-cutting measures. In January 2012, he started writing for the London Evening Standard.

Barclay is a regular guest on the Sky Sports programme Sunday Supplement, and LBC 97.3's Saturday sports show "Scores".

Books
Barclay has written a biography of fellow Scotsman, the Manchester United manager Alex Ferguson, entitled Football – Bloody Hell!. The book was published in October 2010. He also wrote biography of former Arsenal manager Herbert Chapman titled as The Life and Times of Herbert Chapman: The Story of One of Football's Most Influential Figures. Also, he is the author of one of José Mourinho's biographies.

References

External links
 Patrick Barclay column The Times Online
 Patrick Barclay Twitter

People educated at the High School of Dundee
Scottish sportswriters
Living people
Year of birth missing (living people)